Diaphus kuroshio is a species of lanternfish found in the Northwest Pacific Ocean.

Size

Etymology
The fish was named for its occurrence in the Kuroshio Waters of Japan.

References

Myctophidae
Taxa named by Basil Nafpaktitis
Fish of Japan
Fish described in 1978